A retail cashier or simply a cashier is a person who handles the cash register at various locations such as the point of sale in a retail store.  The most common use of the title is in the retail industry, but this job title is also used in the context of accountancy for the person responsible for receiving and disbursing money or within branch banking in the United Kingdom for the job known in the United States as a bank teller.

Retail

In a shop, a cashier (or checkout operator) is a person who scans the goods through a cash register that the customer wishes to purchase at the retail store. In most modern shops, the items are scanned by a barcode positioned on the item with the use of a laser scanner. After all of the goods have been scanned, the cashier then collects the payment (in cash, check and/or by credit/debit card) for the goods or services exchanged, records the amount received, makes change, and issues receipts or tickets to customers. Cashiers will record amounts received and may prepare reports of transactions, reads and record totals shown on cash register tape and verify against cash on hand. A cashier may be required to know value and features of items for which money is received; may cash checks; may give cash refunds or issue credit memorandums to customers for returned merchandise; and may operate ticket-dispensing machines and the like.

In one form or another, cashiers have been around for thousands of years. In many businesses, such as grocery stores, the cashier is a "stepping stone" position. Many employers require employees to be cashiers in order to move up to customer service or other positions.

Cashiers are at risk of repetitive strain injuries due to the repeated movements often necessary to do the job, such as entering information on a keypad or moving product over a scanner. Included also is the physical strain of standing on one's feet for several hours in one spot. Because of this, many cashiers are only able to do a six-hour-long shift under different policies.

Accountancy 

A less-current meaning of the term referred to the employee of a business responsible for receiving and disbursing money. In a non-retail business, this would be a position of significant responsibility. With an ever-larger proportion of transactions being done using cash substitutes (such as checks, credit cards, and debit cards), the amount of cash handled by such employees has declined, and this usage of the word "cashier" has been largely supplanted by the title comptroller.

Retail banking
In a bank branch in the United Kingdom, a cashier is someone who enables customers to interact with their accounts, such as by accepting and disbursing money and accepting checks. In the United States, the job title is bank teller.

Fictional cashiers
Flo, in commercials for Progressive Insurance
Irene Morrison, in the film Down to the Bone
Howard Prince, in the film The Front, played by Woody Allen
Squidward Tentacles, in the animated TV show SpongeBob SquarePants
Romy White, in the film Romy and Michele's High School Reunion
Each member of The Tenderloins have posed as cashiers for their show Impractical Jokers

See also
 Cashier balancing
 Legal cashier
 Chief Cashier of the Bank of England

External links

 Online Payment Gateway

Banking occupations
Personal care and service occupations
Sales occupations